The 1988 Paris–Nice was the 46th edition of the Paris–Nice cycle race and was held from 6 March to 15 March 1988. The race started in Paris and finished at the Col d'Èze. The race was won by Sean Kelly of the Kas team.

Route

General classification

References

1988
1988 in road cycling
1988 in French sport
March 1988 sports events in Europe